Miller's Crossing (Manx: Crossag Miller) is a small request stop on outskirts of Laxey on the route of the Manx Electric Railway on the Isle of Man.

Location

Like several other unofficial stopping places, it is placed on the intersection of a narrow access road and is mostly used by localised traffic only.  The main station for the village is a few minutes tram ride away and the halt as such is not officially named, being known by its colloquial name.

Also
Manx Electric Railway Stations

References

Sources
 Manx Manx Electric Railway Stopping Places (2002) Manx Electric Railway Society
 Island Island Images: Manx Electric Railway Pages (2003) Jon Wornham
 Official Official Tourist Department Page (2009) Isle Of Man Heritage Railways

Railway stations in the Isle of Man
Manx Electric Railway
Railway stations opened in 1894